Jenő Gáspár (19 June 1896 – 2 January 1945) was a Hungarian track and field athlete who competed in the 1924 Summer Olympics. In 1924 he finished fifth in the high jump competition. He was killed in action during World War II.

References

External links
 

1896 births
1945 deaths
Hungarian male high jumpers
Olympic athletes of Hungary
Athletes (track and field) at the 1924 Summer Olympics
Hungarian civilians killed in World War II